Ireneo García Alonso (25 March 1923 – 4 June 2012) was a Spanish prelate of the Catholic Church.

García Alonso was born in Quintanilla Vivar, Spain and ordained a priest on 27 March 1948. García Alonso was appointed bishop of the Diocese of Albacete on 7 December 1968 and ordained a bishop on 25 January 1969. He resigned as bishop of Albacete on 4 August 1980. He died in Toledo on 4 June 2012, aged 89.

See also
 Diocese of Albacete

References

External links
 Catholic-Hierarchy 
 Albacete Diocese 

1923 births
2012 deaths
20th-century Roman Catholic bishops in Spain
21st-century Roman Catholic bishops in Spain